Valery Ananyevych Bevz is a People's Deputy of Ukraine, was a member of the Communist Party fraction in Verkhovna Rada from November 2007 to December 2012,), a militia general-lieutenant and Secretary of the Committee on Legislative Support of Law Enforcement from December 2007.

Biography 
Bevz was born on January 27, 1953, in Kozyntsi village, Vinnytsia Oblast, Ukraine. His spouse, Marianna (b. 1955),is a pensioner. They have a daughter, Svetlana (b. 1980), who is a crime investigator.

Education
In 1978, Bevz graduated from Gorky High School of the USSR Interior Ministry and in 1991 graduated from the Academy of the USSR Interior Ministry.

Career
 1971–73 – military service in Soviet Army
 1978–96 – inspector, senior inspector, chief of public service to combat economic crime; 1st Deputy Chief, then Chief of the district office of internal affairs, Executive Officer, Deputy Director, then Director of Human Resources department, Head of the Department for work with military personnel, 1st Deputy Head of the Ministry of Internal Affairs of Ukraine in Vinnytsia region, the Chief of the criminal police in Vinnytsia region.
 June 1996 – chief of the Office of Internal Affairs of Ukraine in the Chernivtsi region
 December 1996 – chief of the Office of Internal Affairs of Ukraine in the Chernihiv region
 2000–03 – chief of the Office of Internal Affairs of Ukraine in Vinnitsa region
 2003–04 – Rector of the Odessa Institute of Legal Affairs affiliated with National University of Internal Affairs
 2004–05 – Deputy Head of Vinnytsia Regional State Administration
 2007 – Deputy Minister of Emergencies and Affairs of Population Protection from Consequences of Chernobyl Accident
 November 2007 – December 2012 – Deputy of the Verkhovna Rada of Ukraine of the 6th convocation (elected from the Communist Party, No. 7 in the list)

Bevz did not return to parliament after the 2012 Ukrainian parliamentary election after losing in Ukraine's 11th electoral district (first-past-the-post wins a parliament seat) located in Vinnytsia Oblast).

From 2007 - Secretary of the Committee on Legislative Support of Law Enforcement
From November 2007 - member of the Communist Party fraction
2006–07 - worked as Vinnytsia Regional Council deputy

Awards
Order of Merits, III class (1999); medal "For Honourable Service", III, II class

See also
2007 Ukrainian parliamentary election
List of Ukrainian Parliament Members 2007
Verkhovna Rada

References

External links 
 Valery Bevz at Verkhovna Rada of Ukraine official web site

1953 births
Living people
People from Vinnytsia Oblast
Sixth convocation members of the Verkhovna Rada
Communist Party of Ukraine politicians
Recipients of the Order of Merit (Ukraine), 3rd class